Catherine Amusugut is a Ugandan geologist and corporate executive, who serves as a Geoscience Manager at the Uganda National Oil Company (UNOC), since August 2017. Before that, from January 2007 until August 2017, she served as a Geologist at the Petroleum Exploration and Production Department (PEPD), in the Uganda Ministry of Energy and Mineral Development.

Background and education
She was educated at Makerere University, Uganda's largest and oldest public university, where she graduated with a Bachelor of Science in Geology and Chemistry. Later, in 2010, she obtained a Master of Science in Petroleum Geoscience, from the University of Aberdeen, in Scotland.

Career
Amusugut joined the PEPD in January 2007, beginning as Geologist-trainee, while she was still an undergraduate at Makerere University. Following her graduation with a BSc degree in geology, she was hired full-time as a geologist. Her responsibilities included reviewing the work plans submitted by the oil companies to make sure the plans are efficient and geologically, environmentally and commercially "viable". If all the criteria are met, permission to proceed with drilling is granted. In this capacity, she interacts with corporate executives of international oil companies, on the best plan of action.

In 2017, she was hired as Geoscience Manager at Uganda National Oil Company (UNOC).

Scientific writings
Amusugut has written several scientific papers in her area of expertise, which have been presented at international conferences and/or published in peer journals.

See also
 Pauline Irene Batebe
 Proscovia Nabbanja
 Josephine Wapakabulo
 Economy of Uganda

References

External links
Website of the Uganda Ministry of Energy and Minerals 
Enhancing National Participation in the Oil and Gas Industry in Uganda

1983 births
Living people
Ugandan geologists
Itesot people
People from Eastern Region, Uganda
Makerere University alumni
Ugandan women geologists
Alumni of the University of Aberdeen
Ugandan civil servants
21st-century Ugandan women scientists
21st-century Ugandan scientists